False Pride is a 1925 American silent drama film directed by Hugh Dierker and starring Owen Moore, Faire Binney, Ruth Stonehouse, and J. Barney Sherry.

Plot
As described in a film magazine review, a young man who prefers legal practice to a life of ease is engaged by a wealthy woman to investigate the past of her niece, whom she wishes to adopt. He falls in love with the girl as soon as he sees her, though he has no sympathy for many of her ideas and for her manner of living. After a series of incidents that almost result in his going to prison, the young attorney overcomes the young woman’s false notions about success. Then a wedding is arranged.

Cast

Preservation
With no prints of False Pride located in any film archives, it is a lost film.

References

Bibliography
 Robert B. Connelly. The Silents: Silent Feature Films, 1910-36, Volume 40, Issue 2. December Press, 1998.

External links
 

1925 films
1925 drama films
1920s English-language films
American silent feature films
Silent American drama films
American black-and-white films
Films directed by Hugh Dierker
1920s American films